Tanypskiye Klyuchi is a rural locality (a village) in Chernushinsky District, Perm Krai, Russia. The population was 168 as of 2010. There are 4 streets.

Geography 
Tanypskiye Klyuchi is located 18 km south of Chernushka (the district's administrative centre) by road. Nikolayevsky is the nearest rural locality.

References 

Rural localities in Chernushinsky District